Stenoma blandula is a moth of the family Depressariidae. It is found in Venezuela and Paraguay.

The wingspan is 17–18 mm. The forewings are pale yellow ochreous, slightly pinkish tinged and with a dark grey dot in the disc at one-fourth, as well as traces of a faint irregular rather oblique line of grey irroration crossing the wing beyond this. There are two dark fuscous dots transversely placed on the end of the cell and a small cloudy grey spot beneath the middle of the costa, where an indistinct series of scattered grey scales passes around the upper margin of the cell and behind these dots. A rather large cloudy dark grey spot is found on the costa at three-fourths, where a series of cloudy dark grey dots, abruptly curved above the middle, runs to the dorsum before the tornus. There is also a series of small marginal dark fuscous dots along the termen. The hindwings are yellow whitish.

References

Moths described in 1915
Taxa named by Edward Meyrick
Stenoma